Gornja Rijeka is a municipality in the Koprivnica-Križevci County in Croatia. 

According to the 2011 census, there are 1,779 inhabitants in the area, with Croats forming an absolute majority.

History

In the late 19th century and early 20th century, Gornja Rijeka was part of the Bjelovar-Križevci County of the Kingdom of Croatia-Slavonia.

During World War II, when the village was part of the Independent State of Croatia, it was the site of the Gornja Rijeka concentration camp where several hundred children were interned by the Ustaše in 1941 and 1942.

Demographics
According to 2011 Croatian census, 1,779 people live in 14 census-registered settlements:

 Barlabaševec – 19
 Deklešanec – 136
 Donja Rijeka – 218
 Dropkovec – 172
 Fajerovec– 76
 Fodrovec Riječki – 61
 Gornja Rijeka – 340
 Kolarec– 148
Kostanjevec Riječki – 267
 Lukačevec – 23
 Nemčevec – 18
 Pofuki – 185
 Štrigovec – 37
 Vukšinec Riječki – 79

Notable people
Sidonija Rubido (1819–1884), opera singer. She helped establish the first elementary school in Gornja Rijeka.

References

External links
 Gornja Rijeka official site

Municipalities of Croatia
Populated places in Koprivnica-Križevci County